Binge & Purge is the second studio album by the American punk band the Lunachicks. It was released in 1992 via Safe House. The album was produced by Mason Temple along with the band. The album was recorded at SST, Weehawken, NJ, mixed at Quad Recording, NYC, and mastered at MDI, Toronto.

Critical reception
AllMusic called the album "more Poison than punk rock," writing that "the Lunachicks' follow-up to the promising Babysitters on Acid is disjointed and disappointing." Trouser Press wrote that "Binge and Purge, which contains sharply ironic songs about women’s self-image concerns, is the Lunachicks’ great leap forward." Simon Reynolds and Joy Press highlighted the "gleeful revelling in (rather than the repulsion from) the messy murk of female bodiliness." The Philadelphia Inquirer wrote that the album is not without "its simplistic Ramonesy charms," but that "when the 'Chicks upchuck their sense of humor, their monolithic music gets boring fast."

Track listing

References

Lunachicks albums
1992 albums